Heidemann is a German surname. Notable people with the surname include:

Britta Heidemann (born 1982), German épée fencer
Dirk Heidemann (born 1961), German ballroom dancer, fashion model, now author, dance sport coach and choreographer
Gaille Heidemann, American voice actress
Günther Heidemann (1932–2010), boxer from Germany
Gerd Heidemann (born 1931), German journalist known for his role in the publication of forged Hitler Diaries
Hartmut Heidemann (born 1941), German football player
Jørgen Heidemann (born 1946), Danish handball player
Jack Heidemann (born 1949), former right-handed Major League Baseball shortstop
Lavon Heidemann (born 1958), non-partisan member of the Nebraska Legislature
Matthias Heidemann (1912–1970), German footballer
Stefan Heidemann (born 1961), German orientalist at Hamburg University

See also
Heideman

German-language surnames